Hip Hip-Hurry! is a 1958 Warner Bros. Merrie Melodies cartoon directed by Chuck Jones. The short was released on December 6, 1958, and stars Wile E. Coyote and the Road Runner. The title is a pun on the phrase "Hip Hip Hooray!!"

Plot

The Road Runner zooms into view, labeled "Digoutius-unbelievablii", and then moves away to escape Wile E. Coyote, labeled "Eatius-slobbius" (no doubt due to Wile's protruding tongue at this time). Eventually, the chase leads to a 3-way Y fork, leaving the coyote confused as to which way his rival went. The bird answers for him by pulling up behind him and beeping, giving the coyote a real headache on the rocks above. However, before he can chase the Road Runner in that direction, the bird pulls behind him a second time. Wile instantly suspects the situation, and peeks through his legs, but this only leads to him bumping his head on the ground when the Road Runner beeps. The chase now begins in full force, ending when the Road Runner barely escapes the coyote's grip and sets a bridge on fire due to his speed. Wile E. is left bemused at the bird's burst of speed, gesturing the incident, and falls through the bridge and down to the ground. After hitting the ground, Wile E. comes up with an idea or two on how to catch the Road Runner.

1. While the Road Runner is munching on desert plants, his opponent attempts to drop a hand grenade on him. However, the grenade, by pure misfortune, drops onto a power line and is hoisted directly back to its owner, instantly wiping the laugh off his face. The grenade explodes, and the unhappy Coyote lets go of the stop perforce. This, however, causes a second grenade to be thrown up to Wile E. and explode on him as well.

Later on, Wile E. paces the cliff he's still on and it isn't until he stops near the edge that he comes up with a new plan.

2. Wile E. starts his painful trapeze act and ends up getting scraped on the ground, hitting the top of a tunnel and hit by the face by an ACME truck.

3. Hoping to ambush the Road Runner, Wile E. loads a firework into a slingshot and prepares to fire it at the Road Runner, but it explodes on him first.

4. Having mined the road with a giant firework, the coyote has logistical problems with the match.  His first attempts has the match burn his face. Finally he is "gratefully" helped out by the Road Runner, who gives the coyote a lit match. As soon as Wile lights the fuse, the Road Runner disappears, causing the coyote to chase after him. The Road Runner then stops next to the firework, signals for the coyote to stop, and points at the sizzling firework before he dodges the explosion, leaving Wile to take the entire blast.

5. To hopefully squash the Road Runner, the coyote flips a rock across a high outcropping, rather predictably leading to the entire outcropping breaking off. Wile continues to flip the rock over, and it is only when the rock ends up in the air above him that he realizes what is happening. He runs through the air to avoid being squashed directly by the rock, and the piece of outcropping lands on a rock to create a see-saw. Wile E. lands on the right end, while the rock smashes onto the left end and sends the coyote up into a rock face, then down onto the see-saw again before he flips the rock onto himself.

6. With his own special motorboat, it looks good for Wile E. Coyote, tearing apart the river as he attempts to catch the Road Runner on the riverbank. However, when he climbs out to attempt to grab his opponent, he sees that he is going over a waterfall and only barely steers himself back in the other direction. With relief, the coyote relaxes until he ends up falling off a second waterfall in the opposite direction.

7. With stealth exhausted, the coyote tries to use raw speed to catch the Road Runner and tests his new high-speed tonic (containing "Vitamins R, P, & M") on an unsuspecting mouse. The mouse rattles around as a "warm-up", then darts across the desert at an impossible speed, and runs up and down a rock arch to return to his tester. Happy with this development, Wile E. releases the mouse, still suffering the effects of RPM, into his hole, and then drinks the entire bottle of it himself. After the warm-up period, Wile begins the chase and quickly begins to erase the Road Runner's considerable head start. However, just as it is getting down to the wire, the Road Runner sidesteps and trips the coyote, making him roll out of control into a construction zone and then into a dynamite shed, along with a kerosene lamp, which explodes everything inside. The small silo top is transformed into a rocket, which is fired through the clouds with its rider and goes off, creating fireworks in the starry night sky, much to Road Runner's amusement.

See also
 Looney Tunes and Merrie Melodies filmography (1950–1959)

References

External links
 
 

1958 animated films
1958 short films
Merrie Melodies short films
Warner Bros. Cartoons animated short films
American animated short films
Short films directed by Chuck Jones
Wile E. Coyote and the Road Runner films
1950s Warner Bros. animated short films
Animated films without speech
Films with screenplays by Michael Maltese
Films about Canis
Animated films about mammals
Animated films about birds